Neil Anthony Harmon (born 9 January 1969) is a former professional rugby league footballer who played in the 1980s, 1990s and 2000s.

Playing career

International honours
Neil Harmon was a British Lion on the 1996 Great Britain & Ireland Rugby League Tour to Papua New Guinea, Fiji and New Zealand. He also won five caps (plus one as a substitute) for Ireland in 1997–2001 while at Huddersfield Giants, Bradford Bulls, and Salford City Reds.

Challenge Cup Final appearances
Neil Harmon played right- in Warrington's 14-36 defeat by Wigan in the 1990 Challenge Cup Final during the 1989–90 season at Wembley Stadium, London on Saturday 28 April 1990, in front of a crowd of 77,729.

County Cup Final appearances
Neil Harmon played as an interchange/substitute, i.e. number 15, (replacing  Carl Webb) in Warrington's 16-28 defeat by Wigan in the 1987 Lancashire Cup Final during the 1987–88 season at Knowsley Road, St. Helens on Sunday 11 October 1987.

Regal Trophy Final appearances
Neil Harmon played left- (replaced by interchange/substitute Rowland Phillips on 79-minutes) in Warrington's 12-2 victory over Bradford Northern in the 1990–91 Regal Trophy Final during the 1990–91 season at Headingley, Leeds on Saturday 12 January 1991.

References

External links
Photograph "Neil Harmon passes" at rlhp.co.uk
Photograph "Bradford Bulls 2000 squad" at rlhp.co.uk
Photograph "Neil Harmon" at rlhp.co.uk
Profile at Leeds Rhinos official website
Statistics at wolvesplayers.thisiswarrington.co.uk

1969 births
Living people
Bradford Bulls players
English rugby league players
Great Britain national rugby league team players
Halifax R.L.F.C. players
Huddersfield Giants players
Ireland national rugby league team players
Leeds Rhinos players
Rugby league players from St Helens, Merseyside
Rugby league props
Rugby league second-rows
Salford Red Devils players
Warrington Wolves players